Jacob Alick (born 11 March 1999) is a Papua New Guinea international rugby league footballer who plays as a er or  for the Gold Coast Titans in the NRL.

Career
Alick made his international debut for Papua New Guinea in their 24-14 victory over Fiji in the 2022 Pacific Test.

References

External links
Burleigh Bears profile

1999 births
Living people
Burleigh Bears players
Papua New Guinea national rugby league team players
Papua New Guinean rugby league players
Rugby league forwards